Astral Project is a modern jazz quartet from New Orleans, Louisiana. It was founded by saxophonist Tony Dagradi in 1978 and includes drummer Johnny Vidacovich, bassist James Singleton and 7-string guitarist Steve Masakowski. The band originally included pianist David Torkanowsky who left in 2001.  Astral Project blends jazz, funk, rock, and world music and has been called one of New Orleans' premier jazz groups.

Astral Project began performing at the Absinthe House on Bourbon Street where during their early years Bobby McFerrin was known to often sit in.  Having made several national and international tours, the quartet has continued to perform more recently at Snug Harbor and at Jazz Fest in New Orleans. Astral Project has received several Big Easy Entertainment Awards.

Discography
 Come With Me (Astral Project)
 Astral Project (Astral Project, 1997)
 Elevado (Compass, 1998)
 Voodoo Bop (Compass, 1999)
 Big Shot (Astral Project, 2003)
 The Legend of Cowboy Bill (Astral Project, 2004)
 Live in New Orleans (Astral Project, 2006)
 Blue Streak (Astral Project, 2008)

References

External links 

 Official site: Astral Project
 
 
 Interview with Tony Dagradi of Astral Project by Larry Englund

American jazz ensembles from New Orleans
Musical groups from New Orleans
Jazz musicians from New Orleans
Musical groups established in 1978
1978 establishments in Louisiana
Compass Records artists